Marius Jacobus "Piet" de Visser  (16 April 1931 – 19 December 2012) was a Dutch politician for the Labour Party (PvdA).

Life and career 
De Visser was born and died in Rotterdam. He studied economics at Erasmus University Rotterdam. Next, he served as a municipal councilor of Monster, South Holland.

From 1981 to 1991, with two interruptions, De Visser was a member of the House of Representatives. He was an anti-nuclear pacifist and belonged to the left-wing of his party. In the late 1980s, he was involved in the making of a new passport. After his political career, he switched parties for GreenLeft.

References 

  Parlement.com biography

1931 births
2012 deaths
Dutch civil servants
Dutch pacifists
Erasmus University Rotterdam alumni
Labour Party (Netherlands) politicians
Members of the House of Representatives (Netherlands)
Municipal councillors in South Holland
People from Monster
Politicians from Rotterdam